Liudmila Samsonova was the defending champion, but chose to participate in Osaka instead.

Varvara Gracheva won the title, defeating Marta Kostyuk in the final, 6–3, 6–2.

Seeds

Draw

Finals

Top half

Bottom half

References

External Links
Main Draw

L'Open 35 de Saint-Malo - Singles
L'Open 35 de Saint-Malo